Germán Velasco (born 31 May 1979) is a Peruvian judoka. He competed in the men's lightweight event at the 2000 Summer Olympics.

References

External links
 
 
 

1979 births
Living people
Peruvian male judoka
Olympic judoka of Peru
Judoka at the 2000 Summer Olympics
Place of birth missing (living people)
20th-century Peruvian people
21st-century Peruvian people